The Krumbach Saddle (951 m.) is a high mountain pass in the Austrian Alps in the state of Lower Austria.

References

See also
 List of highest paved roads in Europe
 List of mountain passes

Mountain passes of the Alps
Mountain passes of Lower Austria